Elisabeth of Sponheim and Vianden, Countess of Mark (1360 - 31 July 1417) was a German noblewoman. She was the last countess at Sponheim of the rear line and countess of Vianden. In 1381 she married Engelbert III of the Mark.

1360 births
1417 deaths
House of Sponheim
Counts of Vianden